Vivienne Smith (born 10 November 1952) is a female Irish former swimmer. Smith competed in two events at the 1968 Summer Olympics. At the ASA National British Championships she won the 200 metres butterfly title in 1969 and 1970.

References

1952 births
Living people
Irish female swimmers
Olympic swimmers of Ireland
Swimmers at the 1968 Summer Olympics
Sportspeople from Dublin (city)
Female butterfly swimmers